The golden-collared macaw or yellow-collared macaw (Primolius auricollis) is a small mostly green Central South American parrot, a member of a large group of Neotropical parrots known as macaws. It has a bright yellow patch on the back of its neck/upper shoulders that gives the species its name. In aviculture, it is one of a number of smaller macaws often called "mini-macaws".

Taxonomy
The yellow-collared macaw was described by American ornithologist John Cassin in 1853. In fact, some literature refers to it as Cassin's macaw or the Yellow-naped macaw. Its specific epithet auricollis meaning gold-collared, from the Latin aurum 'gold', and collum 'neck'. In recent years it has often been placed in the genus Propyrrhura, but this is incorrect as per ICZN rules. Earlier, it had also been placed in the genus Ara.

Description

The general plumage is green, with a distinct yellow collar that is broadest on the back of the neck. The yellow collar develops as the bird ages, with more vibrant colors found in mature birds. The front and crown is brownish black. The remiges and primary coverts are blue and the long, pointed tail has a red base, a narrow green center and a blue tip. The underside of the tail and flight feathers are greenish-yellow, similar to that of several other small macaws such as the blue-winged and red-bellied macaw. The legs are a dull pinkish color, and the iris is reddish to dull yellow. It has extensive bare white facial skin and the heavy bill is black, often tipped pale grey.

Distribution and habitat 
The main population occurs in the Pantanal of Brazil (south-western Mato Grosso, western Mato Grosso do Sul and southern Rondônia), northern Argentina (eastern Jujuy and northern Salta), far northern Paraguay (Alto Paraguay and Concepción) and most of northern and eastern Bolivia (Beni, Santa Cruz, Chuquisaca and Tarija). A second disjunct population occurs in far north-eastern Mato Grosso, south-eastern Pará and western Tocantins in Brazil.

It occurs in forest (but avoids the Amazon Rainforest), woodland, savanna and grassland with scattered trees.

Conservation status
It is generally fairly common and therefore considered to be of least concern by BirdLife International. The species is listed in CITES Appendix II, which means that commercial trade is allowed with an export permit (plus an import permit if required by laws of the importer's country).

Behavior
Typically seen in pairs or, during non-breeding season, small flocks.

Domestic pet behavior
As a domestic pet, a yellow collared is extremely social and demands attention. It requires about three to four hours per day of interaction. When properly cared for they can live up to fifty years.

Temperament
Affectionate, and somewhat mischievous, the yellow-collared macaw has a reputation for being an intelligent and resourceful little parrot. They thrive on attention from their owners, and like other macaws, will seek that attention by any means necessary. They also require a large cage with many toys because they get bored easily. They can have a fairly extensive vocabulary. They can be very affectionate but unpredictable with children. This bird has been known to get aggressive without attention.

Feeding
Feeds on fruits, flower buds and seeds.

Breeding
The yellow-collared macaw nest in a hole in a tree. The eggs are white and there are usually two or three in a clutch. The female incubates the eggs for about 26 days, and the chicks fledge from the nest about 70 days after hatching.

See also

 List of macaws

References

 Juniper, T. & Parr, M. (1998). A Guide to the Parrots of the World. Pica Press, East Sussex. 
 To reassign the genus of three macaws South American Classification Committee.

External links

Stamps (for Argentina, Bolivia) with RangeMap
yellow-collared macaw photo gallery VIREO
 Yellow-collared macaw at Cornell's NeotropicalBirds

golden-collared macaw
Birds of Bolivia
Birds of Brazil
Birds of the Cerrado
Birds of the Pantanal
golden-collared macaw
golden-collared macaw